Rock Township is a township in Mitchell County, Iowa, USA.

History
Rock Township was first settled in 1853.

References

Townships in Mitchell County, Iowa
Townships in Iowa